Kamaljeet Sandhu (born 20 August 1948) is a female Indian athlete who won gold medal at 1970 Bangkok Asian Games in 400 m race. She ran the distance in 57.3 seconds. She is the first Indian woman athlete to win an individual gold medal at Asian games. She is from Punjab state in India. She received Padma Shri award in 1971. In 1971, she was one of the finalists in the World University Games held at Turin, Italy, in 400 metres race. She participated in the Women's 400 metres at the 1972 Munich Olympics, bowing out in the heats. Kamaljeet retired from athletics in 1973. She was also a national-level basketball and inter-varsity hockey player. She went to the 1982 Asian Games as the coach of the Indian women's sprint team. She is also an alumna of Scindia Kanya Vidyalaya.

References 

Asian Games gold medalists for India
Athletes (track and field) at the 1972 Summer Olympics
Olympic athletes of India
Sportswomen from Punjab, India
Indian female sprinters
20th-century Indian women
20th-century Indian people
Recipients of the Padma Shri in sports
1948 births
Living people
Indian Sikhs
Asian Games medalists in athletics (track and field)
Athletes (track and field) at the 1970 Asian Games
Medalists at the 1970 Asian Games